Dieter Thomas Heck (born Carl-Dieter Heckscher; 29 December 1937 – 23 August 2018) was a German television presenter, singer and actor. He is known as the presenter of the popular TV program ZDF-Hitparade, featuring German Schlager music, from 1969 to 1984, reaching millions of people. As an actor, he starred in the TV play Das Millionenspiel in 1970.

Early life 
Heck was born in Flensburg, Germany and grew up in Hamburg. In April 1943, when he was five years old, he developed a stutter after being trapped under a staircase after a nighttime British bombing raid during World War II. The stutter went away after he received training in classical singing at age 16. After completing "Mittelschule" (middle school) and a technical "Oberschule" (high school) he was trained as a "Technischer Kaufmann" (technical salesman) by Borgward in Hamburg and worked afterwards as a salesman. He left the company after four years.

Radio and television career 
In 1959, Heck appeared on Peter Frankenfelds talent show Toi – Toi – Toi, singing Hippe-di-hipp, mein Mädchen. In 1961, he participated in the preliminary round of the Grand Prix Eurovision de la Chanson (now Eurovision Song Contest). After employment as a car salesman, Heck worked for a record company. He visited the radio station Südwestfunk (SWF) in Baden-Baden on 23 November 1963 and was asked to be interviewed because a scheduled guest did not show up. The moderator asked clumsy questions so Heck took over conducting the interview himself. As a result, Herbert Falk offered him the job of hosting a 90-minute "Sendung" (broadcast) every Saturday. Heck then worked for Radio Luxemburg from 1965 to September 1966. It was customary there to use only a first name, and as "Dieter" was already taken, Heck asked readers of the youth magazine Bravo for an alternative name. The readers chose "Thomas", and he has used it since. He collaborated with Frank Elstner and they became friends.

He then worked for SR 1 Europawelle of the Saarländischer Rundfunk. He concentrated on German Schlager music, a topic not favored by other moderators. His series Die Deutsche Schlagerparade was so successful that it was partly recorded. In 1967, he was a co-founder of the award Goldene Europa for German singers, which was first awarded in 1968.

Heck's breakthrough came with ZDF-Hitparade, a TV series for the ZDF in Mainz, based on the model of the Schlagerparade and staged by Truck Branss. It was considered an influential music feature of the 1970s and 1980s. He presented it 183 times between 1969 and 1984. He showcased international performers, but they had to sing in German, including the Libanese Ricky Shayne, the Greek Costa Cordalis, Mireille Mathieu, Mouth & McNeal, Karel Gott, Michael Holm and Marianne Rosenberg.

Heck initiated the award Goldene Stimmgabel. From 1982 to 1989, he was also moderator for the Südwestfunk in the series Gute Laune aus Südwest and Vom Telefon zum Mikrofon. For the ZDF, he moderated 4 gegen 4 (1973), Die Pyramide (1978), Schwarz auf Weiß, Ihr Einsatz bitte – Made in Germany, Das ist ihr Leben (1994), Das große Los, Showpalast, Das Sommer-Hitfestival, Das Silvester-Hitfestival and finally Melodien für Millionen (Melodies for Millions), a gala for the benefit of the German Cancer Aid. He retired from the ZDF in 2007. He said then "It was my life to entertain people. That I succeeded makes me happy."("Mein Leben war es, Menschen zu unterhalten. Dass mir dies gelungen ist, macht mich glücklich"). Heck published his biography in 2011.

As an actor, in 1970 he starred in the role of the presenter in the TV play Das Millionenspiel. He played supporting roles in TV crime series, such as Tatort in 1981, Rosenheim-Cops, Praxis Bülowbogen, and Stuttgart Homicide in 2009.

Personal life 

Heck married in 1962 and again in 1976. He had two sons and one daughter. He died on 23 August 2018 in Berlin.

Filmography 
Heck played in several films, including:
 1961: Schlagerparade 1961, film
 1970: Das Millionenspiel
 1971: Glückspilze
 1971: Hurra bei uns geht´s rund
 1972: Sternschnuppe
 1973: Klimbim, TV series
 1978: Café Wernicke, TV series
 1981: Tatort – Beweisaufnahme
 1983: Pankow '95
 1987: Praxis Bülowbogen, TV series
 1991: 
 1992: Tatort – Stoevers Fall
 1993: Salto Postale, sitcom
 1994: Heimatgeschichten TV series
 1998: In aller Freundschaft TV series
 1998: Und vor mir die Sterne
 2008: Die Rosenheim-Cops
 2009: Stuttgart Homicide
 2010: C.I.S. – Chaoten im Sondereinsatz

Radio and television shows 
 1966: Die deutsche Schlagerparade
 1969–1984: ZDF-Hitparade
 1978–1994: Die Pyramide

 1981–2007: Goldene Stimmgabel
 1988–2000: 
 1985–2007: 

 1991–1998: Musik liegt in der Luft
 1996–2000: Das große Los
 1994, 1997–1999: Die deutschen Schlagerfestspiele

Awards 
 1971: Goldene Kamera in the category Beste Sendung für junge Leute (best feature for young people) for ZDF-Hitparade
 1984: Order of Merit of the Federal Republic of Germany
 1999: Saarländischer Verdienstorden, the Order of Merit of the State of Saarland
 2000: Verdienstmedaille of Baden-Württemberg, the Order of Merit of the State of Baden-Württemberg
 2001: The Goldene Feder, a special prize for charity work
 2003: Verdienstorden des Landes Rheinland-Pfalz, the Order of Merit of the State of Rhineland-Palatinate
 2008: Echo Music Prize for exceptional merits for music in German
 2009: Order of Merit of the Federal Republic of Germany
 2012: Deutscher Musikpreis
 2017: Goldene Kamera lifetime achievement award

References

Literature 
 Peter Lanz: Dieter Thomas Heck – Die Biographie, Edel Books. Hamburg 2011. .

External links

 
 Katja Schwemmers: Dieter Thomas Heck: Manche werden schon einen Joint geraucht haben, Focus 24 October 2011 
 Dieter Thomas Heck: Sein Schlager-Königreich, Berliner Kurier 18 October 2011 
 Frank Patalong: Stigma Stottern / Wenn eine Wand im Mund steht, Der Spiegel 22 October 2011 
 Die berühmtesten Stotterer der Welt, Rhein-Sieg-Anzeiger 
 Dieter Thomas Heck und seine 40 Jahre ZDF (photos) Die Welt

1937 births
2018 deaths
German radio presenters
German male television actors
German male singers
German game show hosts
People from Flensburg
Officers Crosses of the Order of Merit of the Federal Republic of Germany
Recipients of the Order of Merit of Baden-Württemberg
Echo (music award) winners
ZDF people
Saarländischer Rundfunk people
Recipients of the Saarland Order of Merit